The 2000 Acropolis Rally (formally the 47th Acropolis Rally) was the seventh round of the 2000 World Rally Championship. The race was held over three days between 9 June and 11 June 2000, and was won by Ford's Colin McRae, his 20th win in the World Rally Championship.

Background

Entry list

Itinerary
All dates and times are EEST (UTC+3).

Results

Overall

World Rally Cars

Classification

Special stages

Championship standings

FIA Cup for Production Rally Drivers

Classification

Special stages

Championship standings

References

External links
 Official website of the World Rally Championship

Acropolis Rally
2000 World Rally Championship season
2000 in Greek sport